Odisha Football Club is an Indian professional football club based in Bhubaneswar, Odisha. The club was founded as Odisha FC in 2019. Odisha currently plays in the Indian Super League, one of the two co-existing premier football leagues in India along with I-League. 

All stats are accurate as of match played on 23 February 2020.

Club

Update
As of 27 February 2021

Overview

Overall records

Head coaches

General
Note: When scores are mentioned, score of Odisha are given first.
First match: 1–2 (vs Jamshedpur, Indian Super League, 22 October 2019)
First win: 4–2 (vs Mumbai City, Indian Super League, 31 October 2019)
First goalscorer:  Aridane Santana (vs Jamshedpur, Indian Super League, 22 October 2019)
First Indian goalscorer:  Jerry Mawihmingthanga (vs Mumbai City, Indian Super League, 31 October 2019)
First goal in home ground:  Carlos Delgado (vs Hyderabad, Indian Super League, 11 December 2019)
Biggest win (in Indian Super League):
4–2 (vs Mumbai City, 31 October 2019)
2–0 (vs Chennaiyin, 6 January 2020)
2–0 (vs Mumbai City, 11 January 2020)
Biggest loss (in Indian Super League):
1–6 (vs Mmbai City, 24 February 2021)

Club Captains

Appearances
Record appearance maker:  18 – Martín Pérez Guedes  18 – Narayan Das  18 – Xisco Hernández
Most appearances in Indian Super League:  18 – Martín Pérez Guedes  18 – Narayan Das  18 – Xisco Hernández

Most Appearances
As of 23 February 2020
(Players with their names in bold currently play for the club.)

Goals
All time top scorer: 9 - Aridane Santana
Most goals in Indian Super League: 9 - Aridane Santana
Most goals in a season: 9 - Aridane Santana
Most goals in a match: 3
 Manuel Onwu (vs Kerala Blasters, Indian Super League, 23 February 2020)

Most Goals
As of 23 February 2020
(Players with their name in bold currently plays for the club.)

Hattricks

Other

Most Assists
As of 23 February 2020
(Players with their name in bold currently plays for the club.)

Most Clean Sheets
As of 23 February 2020
(Players with their name in bold currently plays for the club.)

See also
 Odisha FC
 2019–20 Odisha FC season
 Indian Super League
 Football in India

References

Odisha FC-related lists